Mus or MUS may refer to:

Abbreviations
 MUS, the ISO 3166-1 alpha-3 country code for Mauritius
 MUS, the IATA airport code for Minami Torishima Airport
 MUS, abbreviation for the Centre for Modern Urban Studies on Campus The Hague, Leiden University, Netherlands
 MUS, abbreviation for Medically unexplained physical symptoms
 MUS, abbreviation for the Memphis University School
 MUS, abbreviation for the Movimiento Unión Soberanista
 MUS, abbreviation for  Multiple-use water supply system, a low-cost, equitable water supply systems
 Mus, abbreviation for Musca, a southern constellation
 mus, ISO-639 code for the Muscogee language
 Mus., abbreviation used in music degrees such as B.Mus. and M.Mus.
 MUs, or million units of energy, used in India for a gigawatt hour

People
 Anders Mus (fl. 1501–1535), Danish civil servant in Norway
 Conny Mus (1950–2010), Dutch journalist, best known as a correspondent for RTL Nieuws in Israel and the Middle East
 Gus Mus (born 1944), Islamic leader from Indonesia affiliated to Nahdlatul Ulama
 Italo Mus (1892–1967), Italian impressionist painter
 Paul Mus (1902–1969), French author and scholar of Vietnam and other Southeast Asian cultures
 Publius Decius Mus, three ancient Romans from the same family

Places
 Mus, Gard, a commune of the Gard département in France
 Mus, Lorestan, a village in Lorestan Province, Iran
 Mus, West Azerbaijan, a village in West Azerbaijan Province, Iran
 Muş, a city in Turkey, capital of Muş Province
 Muş Province, an administrative subdivision of Turkey
 Mus, Car Nicobar, a village in India

Others

 Mus (genus), the genus of rodents containing many species of mice
 Mus (subgenus), a sub-genus of Mus containing the house mouse
 Mus (card game), a Spanish card game

See also
 Muse (disambiguation)

Surnames from nicknames